Tober is a surname. Notable people with the surname include:

 Gene Tober, American soccer player
 Michał Tober (born 1975), Polish politician
  (1882–1964), German cinematographer
 Ronnie Tober (born 1945), Dutch singer

See also
 Tobey